Papa The Great is a 2000 Indian Hindi-language drama film directed by K. Bhagyaraj. A remake of his own Tamil film Vaettiya Madichu Kattu (1998), it stars Krishan Kumar, Nagma and Master Bobby. The film focuses on a meek man who lives a peaceful life with his wife and son. However, things contort after he witnesses a murder committed by a dreaded gangster. It was released on 28 July 2000 and failed commercially.

Plot 

Jai Prakash, an engineer, lives peacefully with his wife Pooja and son Sonu. The latter believes his father is a macho, but this is not true; Jai is meek, to the point that he would surrender rather than fight. But when Jai witnesses a murder committed by the dreaded gangster Raka, he must find the courage to testify in court.

Cast 
 Krishan Kumar as Jai Prakash
 Nagma as Pooja Jai Prakash
 Satya Prakash as Raka
 Master Bobby as Sonu
 Satish Kaushik as Chutki Prasad
 Laxmikant Berde as Mungherilal
 Mahavir Shah as a policeman
 Anil Dhawan as a police inspector
 Shama Deshpande as Radha
 Shatrughan Sinha as Biharilal

Production 
Papa The Great is a remake of director K. Bhagyaraj's own Tamil film Vaettiya Madichu Kattu (1998). It was produced by Gulshan Kumar of T-Series, and the screenplay was written by Bhagyaraj, while Nawab Arzoo wrote the dialogues. Cinematography was handled by K. S. Prakash Rao. The final cut of the film was 143 minutes.

Soundtrack 
The soundtrack was composed by Nikhil–Vinay.

Release and reception 
Papa The Great was released on 28 July 2000. Critic Taran Adarsh wrote for Bollywood Hungama, "On the whole, [Papa The Great] lacks in qualities to have a safe ride at the box-office."

References

External links 
 
 

Films directed by K. Bhagyaraj
Films with screenplays by K. Bhagyaraj
Hindi remakes of Tamil films
Indian drama films
2000 drama films
2000 films
Hindi-language drama films